Talip Peshkepia (born January 3, 1986) is an American film composer and songwriter. He is best known for his work on Shining Stars (2010).

Early life 
Peshkepia was born and raised in Los Angeles, California.

Career 
From 2009 to 2011, Peshkepia performed and recorded the orchestral pop albums Opportunities (2009), Shining Stars (2010), and Post Mortem (2011) under the songwriting moniker "Paulie Pesh."

Peshekpia's song "Shining Stars" is featured in the Josh Stolberg film Conception (2011) starring Alan Tudyk and David Arquette.

Peshkepia's song "Nothing Happened" is featured in the "Despicable B" episode of Gossip Girl.

In 2013, Peshkepia (credited as "Paulie Pesh") performed acoustic and electric guitar on Chris Schlarb's Psychic Temple II (2013) (Asthmatic Kitty).

Peshkepia partnered with Jared Freitag of Backwoods Animation Studio to launch an animated children's musical series called The Scribbles (2017).

Peshkepia scored the Rob Margolies film Weight (2018) starring Zachery Byrd, Ashley Johnson, Jason Mewes, Randy Quaid, and Kathy Najimy.

Peshekpia scored the Matt Leal film What We Leave Behind (2018) starring Kansas Bowling.

Personal life
Peshkepia is of Italian, Albanian, and Mexican descent.

Discography
Studio Albums

Solo
 Nine Spirits (TBA)

As Paulie Pesh
 Opportunities (2009)
 Shining Stars (2010)
 Post Mortem (2011)

Filmography
Film

Television

References

External links 
 Official Website
 

Living people
1986 births
People from Los Angeles
American people of Italian descent
American people of Albanian descent
American people of Mexican descent
Songwriters from California
American television composers
American film score composers